Notes from Planet Earth – The Ultimate Collection is a 2001 compilation album by Chris de Burgh.  It was released by Mercury Records on March 19, 2001. The official Chris de Burgh website shows two different tracklists, one for the UK version and one for the Canadian version and also notes "Brand new compilation album, featuring the brand new song "Two Sides to Every Story" with Shelley Nelson (Tin Tin Out)."

Track listings

UK version

"Don't Pay the Ferryman"
"Missing You 2001"
"Fatal Hesitation"
"Ship to Shore"
"The Lady in Red"
"When I Think of You"
"Sailing Away"
"Two Sides to Every Story" (featuring Shelley Nelson)
"Tender Hands"
"A Spaceman Came Travelling"
"I Want It (And I Want It Now)" (DJ Q-Ball Remix) 
"Patricia the Stripper 2000"
"Borderline"
"Say Goodbye to It All"
"Where Peaceful Waters Flow"
"This Waiting Heart"
"High on Emotion"

Canadian version

"Don't Pay the Ferryman"
"Missing You 2001"
"Ship to Shore"
"The Lady in Red"
"When I Think of You"
"Sailing Away"
"Two Sides to Every Story "
"Tender Hands"
"A Spaceman Came Travelling"
"I Want It (And I Want It Now)" (DJ Q-ball Remix)
"Borderline"
"Say Goodbye to It All"
"Where Peaceful Waters Flow"
"Spanish Train"
"High on Emotion"
"Quand Je Pense a Toi"
"Le Coeur D'Une Femme"

External links
Official site for album
Official site track listing for the album

Chris de Burgh albums
2001 compilation albums
Mercury Records compilation albums